Les Deux Souris blanches  is a 1974 film directed by Zouhaier Mahjoub.

Synopsis
An evil witch called Khira transforms a couple of princes, Jamil and Jamila, into two white mice. She also tells them that they will not recover their human form again until another human discovers the strongest person in the world, capable of making her perish by fire.

External links

1974 films
Tunisian speculative fiction films
1970s fantasy films
Tunisian short films